Eastwood is a neighborhood in east Dallas, Texas (USA) adjacent to Lake Park Estates, Old Lake Highlands, and Lochwood. It is located near White Rock Lake.

Boundaries 
Eastwood is east of Peavy and west of Easton, south of Lake Highlands Drive, and north of Lake Gardens (including both sides of the street)

Education 
The neighborhood is served by the Dallas Independent School District.  Children in the neighborhood attend Victor H. Hexter Elementary School, Robert T. Hill Middle School, and Bryan Adams High School.

References